The Pacificateur was a  80-gun ship of the line of the French Navy, designed by Sané. She was the first ship to sustain damage from Paixhans shells, during test-firing of Paixhans' canon-obusiers.

History 
Commissioned in Antwerp in 1814, Pacificateur remained anchored at the entrance of the harbour to protect it until the Bourbon Restoration. In September 1814, she arrived in Brest, where she stayed until she was condemned, in 1824.

In January 1824, Pacificateur was used as a target ship to test new 22 cm canon-obusiers invented by Henri-Joseph Paixhans. The wooden sides of Pacificateur sustained devastating damages from the explosive shell, starting the decline of wooden warships and rise of the ironclads.

References

Ships of the line of the French Navy
Ships built in France
Bucentaure-class ships of the line
Ships sunk as targets
1811 ships